Adam Krzysztofiak (21 January 1951 – 16 January 2008) was a Polish ski jumper. He competed at the 1972 Winter Olympics and the 1976 Winter Olympics.

References

External links
 
 
 
 

1951 births
2008 deaths
Polish male ski jumpers
Olympic ski jumpers of Poland
Ski jumpers at the 1972 Winter Olympics
Ski jumpers at the 1976 Winter Olympics
Sportspeople from Zakopane
20th-century Polish people